He Zhen (1321 - 1388) was a Chinese politician during the late Yuan dynasty (1271–1368) and early Ming dynasty (1368–1644).

Biography
He Zhen was born in Dongguan, Guangdong in 1321, to He Shuxian, an official in the Yuan government. When He Zhen was 8 years old, his father died. In 1363, in the 23rd year of Zhizheng period of the Yuan dynasty, his troops released Guangzhou, capital of Guangdong province. He was appointed as vice-minister of Guangdong and prime minister of Jiangxi and Fujian provinces. He was one of the most powerful officials and held highest rank in the three provinces of Guangdong, Jiangxi and Fujian.

In 1368, in the 1st year of Hongwu period of the Ming dynasty, He Zhen surrendered to the Ming government. He was appointed vice-minister of Jiangxi province. In 1378, the Ming court conferred him with the title of "Count of Dongguan" upon his contributions of protecting the people in Guangdong province.

In 1388, he died at the age of 67, and was given the posthumous name Zhongjing.

Personal life
He had three sons: He Rong, He Gui and He Hong, who all died in connection with Lan Yu's rebellion.

References

Bibliography
 

1321 births
People from Dongguan
1388 deaths
Yuan dynasty politicians
Ming dynasty politicians